Park Road 1836 (PR 1836), also known as San Jacinto Battleground State Park Road and Juan N. Seguin Boulevard, is a Park Road in southeast Texas. The designation is given to multiple roads on the park grounds. The road was designated as PR 9 in 1939 before receiving its current designation in 1960.

Route description

PR 1836 begins at an intersection with Independence Parkway near several oil refineries in Houston, Harris County. From here, the park road heads northeast along two-lane undivided Juan N. Seguin Boulevard onto the grounds of San Jacinto Battleground State Historic Site, passing through a park gate. The PR 1836 designation extends along all the roads on the park grounds. Marker Drive leads northwest from Juan N. Seguin Boulevard and serves the park headquarters and the site of the USS Texas. Juan N. Seguin Boulevard continues northeast and loops around the San Jacinto Monument as Monument Circle. Another branch of PR 1836 heads southeast from the intersection of Juan N. Seguin Boulevard and Marker Drive and turns north before reaching a dead end adjacent to the Marsh and Wetlands Habitat. Another section of the park road runs from Monument Circle southeast alongside the Marsh and Wetlands Habitat before turning southwest to intersect the easterly branch of PR 1836.

History
The route was first designated on September 26, 1939 as PR 9. PR 9 was transferred to PR 1836 on June 2, 1960 to commemorate the year that Texas won its independence from Mexico. The route has remained on the same roads since 1939. In September 2001, the section of PR 1836 connecting Battleground Road to the park was renamed Juan N. Seguin Boulevard in honor of Juan Seguín, a hero of the Texas Revolution.

Major junctions

References

External links

1836
Transportation in Harris County, Texas
Roads in Houston